Cattletruck were an Australian Pop rock/rock group formed in 1985. The group released one studio album, Ready to Believe in 1987.

History
Cattletruck began as a self-described "irreverent semi-acoustic punkabilly covers outfit", that would play "anywhere, anytime, invited or not" In early 1985 singer/guitarist Paul Janovskis decided to "get serious" and the group independently produced a single "Never Is", which received public radio airplay. This allowed the band to lead support gigs for A-list Australian and International acts. 

In 1986, they signed with Regular Records and began work on their debut album, with a series of singles and video clips released. In December 1987, Ready to Believe was released, which peaked at number 58 on the Australian Charts. 

The band ground to a halt amidst bickering, management problems and financial issues in 1988.

Commencing in 2017, more music was released by the group.

Discography

Albums

Singles

Awards and nominations

Countdown Australian Music Awards
Countdown was an Australian pop music TV series on national broadcaster ABC-TV from 1974–1987, it presented music awards from 1979–1987, initially in conjunction with magazine TV Week. The TV Week / Countdown Awards were a combination of popular-voted and peer-voted awards.

|-
| 1986
| themselves 
| Most Promising New Talent
| 
|-

References

Australian pop rock groups
Musical groups from Melbourne
Musical groups established in 1985
Musical groups disestablished in 1988